Peralta (Basque: Azkoien) is a town and municipality located in the province and  autonomous community of Navarre, northern Spain. It is located 59.5 km from Pamplona, and is on the River Arga, a tributary of the Aragon River which itself flows into the Ebro. The population in 2020 was 5951 (INE) inhabitants. Peralta is one of twenty-seven municipalities that make up the Merindad de Olite in the southern part of Navarre.

Symbology

Flag 
The flag's description:

It's formed by a cloth of 2/3 proportion, red with the shield of the municipality in the center.

Shield 
The Escutcheon of the municipality of Peralta has the following blazon:

A bridge of gold arches on a river, with a tower of the same material

Geography

Location  
It's located in the south part of the Foral Community of Navarre. It has an area of 89 km² and has its limit with Falces (North), Marcilla (East), Funes (South) and Azagra (West)

Relief and hydrology  
It's located in a zone formed by calize. Its river is River Arga.

Demography 
From:INE Archive

Notable citizens
 Miguel Irigaray Gorría (1850-1903), politician
 Emilio Rodríguez Irazusta (1860-1919), inventor of the National Identity Document, a square is dedicated to him near to the church.
 Santos Jorge, musician and composer of national anthem of Panama.
 Carlos Zalduendo, France rugby league International, former president of the French Rugby League Federation et former president of Toulouse Olympique.

References

External links
Ayuntamiento de Peralta
 PERALTA in the Bernardo Estornés Lasa - Auñamendi Encyclopedia (Euskomedia Fundazioa) 

Municipalities in Navarre